The 1984–85 Combined Counties Football League season was the seventh in the history of the Combined Counties Football League, a football competition in England.

The league was won by newcomers Malden Vale for the first time. Another new club, Southwick, finished as runners-up and were promoted to the Isthmian League.

League table

The league was increased from 17 to 19 clubs after Alton Town, Chessington United, Guildford & Worplesdon and Yateley Town left and six new clubs joined:
Farleigh Rovers, joining from the Surrey Premier League.
Fleet Town, joining from the Athenian League.
Horley Town, joining from the Athenian League.
Malden Vale, joining from the London Spartan League.
Merstham, joining from the London Spartan League.
Southwick, transferred from the Sussex County League.

References

External links
 Combined Counties League Official Site

1984-85
1984–85 in English football leagues